(KOF '97) is a fighting game produced by SNK for the Neo Geo arcade and home console in 1997. It is the fourth game in The King of Fighters series. It was ported to the Neo-Geo CD, as well as the PlayStation and the Sega Saturn in Japan only. An updated version titled Global Match featuring online multiplayer was released in 2018 for the PlayStation 4, PlayStation Vita and Steam.

Gameplay

KOF '97 follows the same format as the previous KOF games, but introduces two distinct playing styles which the player can select before choosing their team: Advanced and Extra.

Advanced mode is based on the previous game in the series, KOF '96, but features a revamped Power Gauge. Instead of charging the Power Gauge, the Power Gauge is now filled whenever the player strikes the opponent or by performing Special Moves. The player can stock up to three Power Gauges. The player can use one stock of the Power Gauge to perform a Super Special Move or enter a "MAX" mode, in which the players defensive and offensive strength are increased. Performing a Super Special Move while in MAX mode will make the player perform a more powerful Super Special Move.

Extra mode is based on the first two games in the series, KOF '94 and KOF '95. Like in those games, the player fills the Power Gauge by charging it or defending against the opponents attacks. After the gauge is filled, the player enters MAX mode and like in Advanced, their character's offense and defense will increase. The player can only perform Super Special Moves in MAX mode or when the life gauge is near empty and flashing red. When the player performs a Super move in MAX mode while the life gauge is flashing red, then the Super move will be even more powerful. The Emergency Roll maneuver from KOF '96 used in Advanced mode is replaced by the side-step from KOF '94 and KOF '95.

Plot and characters

Despite the events at the end of the previous game, the KOF tournament was a huge commercial success and sparked a worldwide fighting craze. Within a few months of the tournament ending, various large corporations had held smaller KOF tournament qualifiers and constructed special KOF stadiums around the world, building the excitement up for the next tournament. News of the tournament spread through every form of media and fans and new fighters from across the globe come to watch the preliminary matches.

All of the characters from the previous game return, with the exception of the Boss Team (which was disbanded after its first appearance), Kasumi Todoh (who went off to search for her father), and Mature and Vice (who were killed by Iori Yagami after he was possessed by the Riot of Blood at the conclusion of the previous game).

Chizuru Kagura, the sub-boss in the previous game, takes Kasumis place in the Women Fighters Team, while Geese Howard's underling Billy Kane, who previously participated in The King of Fighters '95 tournament, returns to join forces with female agent Blue Mary and wanted felon Ryuji Yamazaki (both from Fatal Fury 3: Road to the Final Victory) to form the unlikely "'97 Special Team". Iori returns as a Team Edit character along with Shingo Yabuki, a high school student who patterns his fighting style after his idol and reluctant mentor Kyo Kusanagi. An alternative version of Kyo with his pre-KOF '96 moveset also appears as a hidden character.

Iori and Leona will fight as mid-boss characters in the Riot of the Blood curse depending on which characters the player is using. A team of all new characters also appears in the form of the "New Faces Team", consisting of bandmates Yashiro Nanakase, Shermie, and Chris. The New Faces Team will be revealed to be the last three servants from Orochi during the Arcade Mode. Additionally, they fight as sub-boss characters having more powerful abilities than their common forms. Once they are beaten, Orochi will possess Chris' body to fight as the final boss character.

Japan Team (Hero Team)
Kyo Kusanagi
Benimaru Nikaido
Goro Daimon

Fatal Fury Team
Terry Bogard
Andy Bogard
Joe Higashi

Art of Fighting Team
Ryo Sakazaki
Robert Garcia
Yuri Sakazaki

Ikari Warriors Team
Leona Heidern
Ralf Jones
Clark Still

Psycho Soldier Team
Athena Asamiya
Sie Kensou
Chin Gentsai

Korea Justice Team
Kim Kaphwan
Chang Koehan
Choi Bounge

Women Fighters Team
Chizuru Kagura
Mai Shiranui
King

New Faces Team
Yashiro Nanakase (New Character)
Shermie (New Character)
Chris (New Character)

Special Team
Ryuji Yamazaki (New Character)
Blue Mary (New Character)
Billy Kane

Single Entries
Iori Yagami
Shingo Yabuki (New Character)

Alternate Character
Kyo Kusanagi '94 Version

Mid-Boss
Orochi Iori (New Character)
Orochi Leona (New Character)

Sub-Boss Team
Orochi Yashiro (New Character)
Orochi Shermie (New Character)
Orochi Chris (New Character)

Main Boss
Orochi (New Character)

Scrapped fighters
Duck King - he was a potential candidate for the Billy and Yamazaki's Special Team in KOF '97, but lost the popular vote to Blue Mary. Regardless, he remained a highly requested Fatal Fury competitior among Japanese fans and was added to the roster in The King of Fighters XI with Tung Fue Rue and Geese Howard as Garou Densetsu 1 bonuses to alternately pair Duck King with.

Development
In order to decide who would become the members of the '97 Special Team, three polls were conducted by the video game journals Weekly Famitsu, Gamest and Neo Geo Freak, in which readers voted who was the character they wanted to see in the team. The Neo Geo Freak's winner was Billy Kane and Famitsu's winner was Ryuji Yamazaki. Blue Mary was first in the Gamest poll, barely beating Duck King from the Fatal Fury series who was second in the poll via a few mere votes. Additionally, the three journals created a team, which players can view an image of them after beating the game in the Japanese version. The special team created by the Neo Geo Freak's staff was a team of fire wielders: Billy, Kyo Kusanagi, and Mai Shiranui. The Gamest's team created was composed of Terry Bogard, Blue Mary and Joe Higashi, while Famitsu created a team composed of Chang Koehan, Choi Bounge and Ryuji Yamazaki. Although Blue Mary already had two designs in the Fatal Fury series at this point (her original Fatal Fury 3 design and her Real Bout Special design), her designer wanted to use her Fatal Fury 3 design as he liked it more. In order to have all of the eight servants from Orochi confirmed by this game, Yamazaki was chosen to be the new member as the staff noted him to be a good villain and liked that he was similar to a snake (as the ancient Orochi was a giant snake). In order to adapt him to KOF, the game planner had to provide new moves to Yamazaki. The new moves were initially noted to be failures, but designers later thought of them as successful.

The New Faces Team was created to offset the remaining top three characters. Their members were developed to be the Hero Team's counterparts; Chris manipulates fire like Kyo, Shermie uses lightning like Benimaru Nikaido and Yashiro Nanakase is a giant man like Goro Daimon. The plot element of Chris acting as Orochi's new body was developed since initial stages of production, but the staff had already thought of using other ideas. At the inception of production, the plan was for Chris to use the "Flame of Darkness (Black Flame)," but due to difficulties of seeing the black flame in the screen it was changed to the purple ones. The final boss character, Orochi, was first meant to be "a buck-naked Chris" fighting with a shining energy ball. However, it was opted to his current design after developers made a survey in which there were only two votes in favor of the first design. His design codename was "Chief", but several people were against of giving him the name of "Orochi".

Iori Yagami in his Orochi form was originally meant to be the final boss of the game after the player beats the New Faces Team in their Orochi forms. However, it was later decided to make Orochi Iori the mid-boss with Orochi becoming the final boss and the New Faces Team as the sub-bosses. Series flagship director, Toyohisa Tanabe, states that the staff was initially reluctant to add this version of Iori to the series' roster — worried about fans' reactions — but did so to add more impact to the Orochi Saga's climax. He was particularly pleased to see surprised reactions from female fans to this form during KOF '97's location testing. After deciding Iori as the mid-boss character, developers also were focused in adding Leona as an alternative mid-boss character if players were already using Iori in the game. As such, several advertisements were added such as televisions broadcasts, sent to be given as a message to the player about a "fork in the game" to give hints about Orochi Leona.

In The King of Fighters '96, several moves from Kyo were changed in order to adapt him to the new game system. However, the original moveset was still popular between gamers and as such, an alternative version from Kyo was added to KOF '97. The introduction of this version was noted to be "a hit" with gamers. The staff kept adding new alternative versions of other characters to the sequels. This later led to the creation of the Kyo clones (Kyo-1 and Kyo-2) from The King of Fighters '99.

Release
The King of Fighters '97 was first released in Japanese arcades on July 28, 1997. It was ported to the Neo Geo AES and Neo-Geo CD on September 25, 1997 and October 30, 1997, respectively. A PlayStation version was also released on May 28, 1998. The Sega Saturn version was published on March 26, 1998 and it requires the same 1MB RAM cartridge utilized by the previous game. A "Saturn Best Collection" was released on October 1, 1998, adding a new cover and a lower price. It was also compiled in The King of Fighters Collection: The Orochi Saga in 2008 for the PlayStation 2, PlayStation Portable and Wii. During its release week, the Sega Saturn port of the game sold 94,327 copies in Japan. As of 2004, the sales went to 156,717. The PlayStation port sold 160,124 units.

Reception

In Japan, Game Machine listed The King of Fighters '97 on their September 1, 1997 issue as being the second most-successful arcade game of the month. According to Famitsu, the AES version sold over 19,900 copies in its first week on the market.

Notes

References

External links 
  
 
 The King of Fighters '97 at GameFAQs
 The King of Fighters '97 at Giant Bomb
 The King of Fighters '97 at Killer List of Videogames
 The King of Fighters '97 at MobyGames

1997 video games
2D fighting games
ACA Neo Geo games
Android (operating system) games
Arcade video games
D4 Enterprise games
Fighting games
IOS games
Multiplayer and single-player video games
Neo Geo games
Neo Geo CD games
Nintendo Switch games
PlayStation (console) games
PlayStation Network games
PlayStation 4 games
PlayStation Vita games
Sega Saturn games
SNK games
SNK Playmore games
The King of Fighters games
Ukiyotei games
Video games set in Hong Kong
Video games set in Indonesia
Video games set in Monaco
Video games set in Osaka
Video games set in Seoul
Video games set in the United States
Virtual Console games
Windows games
Video games developed in Japan
Xbox One games
Hamster Corporation games
Code Mystics games